Shivdaspur is a census town and a red light district in Varanasi in eastern Uttar Pradesh in India. It resides on periphery of Varanasi city, surrounded by Lahartara, Manduadih.

Demographics
As of the 2001 Census of India, Shivdaspur had a population of 11,432. Males constitute 54% of the population and females 46%. Shivdaspur has an average literacy rate of 59%, lower than the national average of 59.5%: male literacy is 68%, and female literacy is 48%. In World AIDS Day 2020 : आज है वर्ल्ड एड्स डे, इसके शुरुआती लक्षण और बचाव के तरिके, 14% of the population is under 6 years of age.

Red-light district
In the 1970s the red-light district in Dalamandi, near the Kashi Vishwanath Temple, was closed and the sex-workers moved to Shivdaspur. The area has declined as the number of customers has fallen, partly because the fear of HIV. There have been calls from locals and politicians for the area to be closed.

See also
  
 Prostitution in India
 Prostitution in Asia 
 Prostitution in Kolkata 
 Prostitution in Mumbai 
 Sonagachi 
 All Bengal Women's Union
 Durbar Mahila Samanwaya Committee 
 Male prostitution

References

 
  
 

Census towns in Varanasi district
Cities and towns in Varanasi district
Prostitution in India  
Neighbourhoods in Varanasi
Red-light districts 
Red-light districts in India